Istoria mias zois (Story of a Life) is a 1965 Greek black-and-white film starring Zoi Laskari and Manos Katrakis. The film has sold 534,086 tickets in Athens alone.

Plot

A lady (Zoi Laskari) left the area when they were kicked out of their house and moved to Athens in order to survive. Later, she married the greatest and richest man, who was played by Manos Katrakis.

Cast
 Zoi Laskari ..... Marigo/Maria/Mary Papadima
 Manos Katrakis ..... Mikes Papadimas
 Tasso Kavadia ..... Eleni Papadima
 Anna Paitatzi ..... Amalia Papadopoulou
 Vasilis Mavromatis ..... Petros
 Angelos Mavropoulos ..... Papadopoulos
 Betty Arvaniti ..... Leontiadou
 Athinodoros Prousalis ..... Giorgis

Festival

The film was screened at the Thessaloniki Film Festival (See: 1965 Thessaloniki Film Festival).

See also
List of Greek films

External links

1965 films
Greek drama films
1960s Greek-language films
Films directed by Giannis Dalianidis